Tacaimbó is a city in the state of Pernambuco, Brazil.

Geography
 State - Pernambuco
 Region - Agreste Pernambucano
 Boundaries - Brejo da Madre de Deus   (N);  Cachoeirinha   (S);  São Caitano   (E); Belo Jardim  (W)
 Area - 227.6 km2
 Elevation - 576 m
 Hydrography - Capibaribe, Ipojuca and Una rivers
 Vegetation - Caatinga Hiperxerófila
 Climate - semi arid hot
 Annual average temperature - 26.0 c
 Distance to Recife - 165 km
 Population - 12,859 (2020)

Economy
The main economic activities in Tacaimbó are based in wood industry  and agribusiness especially plantations of beans and manioc; and creations of cattle and goats.

Economic indicators

Economy by Sector
2006

Health indicators

References

Municipalities in Pernambuco